Lucian is a tiny lunar impact crater that is located in the northeastern part of the Mare Tranquillitatis. It was named after 2nd century Greek writer Lucian of Samosata. The nearest named craters are Lyell to the east-southeast, Theophrastus to the northeast and Gardner to the north-northeast. A little farther to the north is Maraldi crater. Lucian was previously designated Maraldi B. 

This is a circular, cone-shaped formation with a negligible interior floor. It has not been significantly degraded by impact erosion.

References

External links

 LTO-61A2 Lucian — L&PI topographic map
Layers in Lucian Crater - Lunar Reconnaissance Orbiter page and image

Impact craters on the Moon